The 2013–14 Swiss Cup was the 89th season of Switzerland's annual football cup competition. The competition started on 14 August 2013 with the first game of Round 1 and ended in May 2014 with the Final. The winners of the competition qualified for the play-off round of the 2014–15 UEFA Europa League. The title holders were Grasshopper Zürich.

Participating clubs
All 19 teams from Super League and Challenge League (teams from Liechtenstein only play in the 2013–14 Liechtenstein Cup) automatically entered this year's competition, as well as 45 teams from lower leagues. Teams from 1. Liga Promotion and below had to qualify through separate qualifying rounds within their leagues. Teams from regional leagues had to qualify by winning the last season's regional cups.

TH Title holders.
FP Qualified for having the lowest fair play points inside its regional tier.
† Qualified in their last season's tier qualifiers before being promoted.
‡ Qualified in their last season's tier qualifiers before being relegated.

Round 1
Teams from Super League and Challenge League were seeded in this round. In a match, the home advantage was granted to the team from the lower league, if applicable.

|-
|colspan="3" style="background-color:#99CCCC"|14 August 2013

|-
|colspan="3" style="background-color:#99CCCC"|17 August 2013

|-
|colspan="3" style="background-color:#99CCCC"|18 August 2013

|}

Round 2
The winners of Round 1 played in this round. Teams from Super League were seeded, the home advantage was granted to the team from the lower league, if applicable. FC Savièse, from the sixth tier of Swiss football, were the lowest-ranked team in this round.

|-
|colspan="3" style="background-color:#99CCCC"|13 September 2013

|-
|colspan="3" style="background-color:#99CCCC"|14 September 2013

|-
|colspan="3" style="background-color:#99CCCC"|15 September 2013

|}

Round 3
The winners of Round 2 played in this round. Teams from Super League were seeded, the home advantage was granted to the team from the lower league, if applicable. FC Baden, from the fourth tier of Swiss football, were the lowest-ranked team in this round.

|colspan="3" style="background-color:#99CCCC"|9 November 2013

|-
|colspan="3" style="background-color:#99CCCC"|10 November 2013

|-
|colspan="3" style="background-color:#99CCCC"|14 November

|}

Quarter-finals
The winners of Round 3 played in the Quarter-finals, there was no home advantage granted in the draw. FC Le Mont, from the third tier of Swiss football, were the lowest-ranked team in this round.

Semi-finals

Final

References

External links
 Official site 
 Official site 

Swiss Cup seasons
Swiss Cup
2013–14 in Swiss football